Paul Alo'o Efoulou (born 12 November 1983) is a Cameroonian former professional footballer who played as a striker and manager.

International career
Paul Alo'o made his debut for the Cameroon national team on 28 March 2009 against Togo in a qualifier for the 2010 World Cup in South Africa. He also played in three other qualifying matches for the same competition and the 2010 African Cup of Nations in Angola, but was not included in Paul Le Guen's 23-man squad for the 2010 FIFA World Cup.

Coaching career
After retiring at the end of the 2018-19 season, Alo'o was hired as assistant coach at CSO Amnéville. He left the position at the end of the year. In May 2020, Alo'o was appointed manager of FC Lunéville's reserve team, which was playing in the Régional 3.

In May 2021, Alo'o was hired by US Raon-l'Étape as a forward coach for the clubs Régional 3 team (reserves) and manager of the futsal section. In July 2022, he was announced as the clubs new reserve manager.

References

External links
 
 
 
 

1983 births
Living people
Association football forwards
Cameroonian footballers
Cameroonian football managers
Cameroon international footballers
2010 Africa Cup of Nations players
Footballers from Yaoundé
Belgian Pro League players
Ligue 1 players
Ligue 2 players
R.E. Mouscron players
Racing Club de France Football players
Entente SSG players
Angers SCO players
AS Nancy Lorraine players
Le Havre AC players
Al-Taawoun FC players
Al-Sailiya SC players
Qatar SC players
FC Martigues players
Saudi Professional League players
Qatar Stars League players
Qatari Second Division players
Cameroonian expatriate sportspeople in France
Cameroonian expatriate footballers
Expatriate footballers in France
Cameroonian expatriate sportspeople in Belgium
Expatriate footballers in Belgium
Cameroonian expatriate sportspeople in Saudi Arabia
Expatriate footballers in Saudi Arabia
Cameroonian expatriate sportspeople in Qatar
Expatriate footballers in Qatar